The FC Basel 1908–09 season was their sixteenth season since the club was formed. The club's chairman was Ernst-Alfred Thalmann, it was his seventh presidential term. FC Basel played their home games in the Landhof.

Overview 
Daniel Hug, who had been team captain for many years, left the club and transferred to Genoa CFC as professional. Emil Hasler was the new team captain and as captain he led the team trainings and was responsible for the line-ups. Basel played 14 friendly games and 14 matches in the Swiss domestic league. Of the 14 friendly games that the team played, four were won and 10 ended in defeats. Nine games were played in Switzerland, six of which at home in the Landhof. The other games were played in Italy, both against Genoa as transfer compensation for Hug, and four in Germany, each once against Karlsruher FV, Britannia Frankfurt, Mannheimer VfB Union and Freiburger FC in Freiburg im Breisgau.

The 1908–09 Serie A was divided into two regional groups, an east group with eight teams and a west group with seven teams. Basel were allocated to the east group, together with local rivals Old Boys Basel and Aarau, Zürich, Grasshopper Club, Young Fellows Zürich, Winterthur, and last but not least, St. Gallen.

There were a number of changes in the Basel team. As mentioned Daniel Hug moved to Italy to play for Genoa CFC. Players such as Dr. Siegfried Pfeiffer, Ernst-Alfred Thalmann, Alfred Stöhrmann and Max Senn left the first team and were replaced by younger members. The newly formed team started the season in the worst possible way, six defeats in a row. The two 1–6 away defeats against Old Boys and Zürich, the 0–6 defeat away against Winterthur, together with the 1–2 home result against Young Fellows Zürich, the 4–5 home defeat against Aarau were only the beginning of the evil. The 2–9 home defeat against Grasshopper Club remains the highest home defeat in history until today. It was not until the seventh round, with a 3–2 win against St. Gallen on 22 November 1908, that Basel achieved their first points. After that they were only defeated once more, on 13 December 1908, a home defeat against Winterthur. Basel ended the season in the East group in sixth position.

Winterthur won the east group, obtaining 25 points seven more than St. Gallen in second position in the league table. But Winterthur were defeated 0–1 by Young Boys Bern in the championship final, which was played on 6 June 2009 in Basel.

Players 
Squad members

Results 
Legend

Friendly matches

Pre-season

Winter break to end of season

Serie A

East group results

East group league table

See also
 History of FC Basel
 List of FC Basel players
 List of FC Basel seasons

Notes

Footnotes 

Incomplete league matches 1908–1909 season: FCB-YF, FCZ-FCB, FCB-Aarau, FCW-FCB, FCB-FCSG, YF-FCB, FCB-FCB, FCB-OB, GC-FCB, FCSG-FCB

References

Sources 
 Rotblau: Jahrbuch Saison 2014/2015. Publisher: FC Basel Marketing AG. 
 Die ersten 125 Jahre. Publisher: Josef Zindel im Friedrich Reinhardt Verlag, Basel. 
 Switzerland 1908-09 at RSSSF
 FCB team 1908-09 at fcb-archiv.ch

External links
 FC Basel official site

FC Basel seasons
Basel